Richard Noel Marx (born September 16, 1963) is an American adult contemporary and pop rock singer-songwriter. He has sold over 30 million albums worldwide.

Marx's self-titled debut album went triple-platinum in 1987, and his first single, "Don't Mean Nothing", reached number three on the Billboard Hot 100 chart. Between 1987 and 1994, he had 14 top 20 hits, including three number one singles. 

Marx is the only male artist in history to have his first seven singles reach the top 5 of the Billboard charts. He has scored a total of 14 number one singles, both as a performer and as a songwriter/producer. As a singer, his No. 1 hits include “Hazard”, "Right Here Waiting", "Hold On to the Nights", "Endless Summer Nights", and "Satisfied". According to Billboard, Marx "holds the distinction of having written songs that have hit No. 1 on various Billboard charts in each of the last four decades."

Marx has written or collaborated on songs with other artists, including "This I Promise You" by NSYNC and "Dance with My Father" by Luther Vandross. Marx has been nominated for five Grammy Awards. In 2003, he won the Grammy for Song of the Year for "Dance with My Father".

Marx's first number one success came in 1984 with "What About Me?" which was recorded by Kenny Rogers, Kim Carnes, and James Ingram.  His second chart-topper was 1985's "Crazy", a song he co-wrote with country music superstar Kenny Rogers.

Early life
Marx was born in Chicago, Illinois, the only child of Ruth (née Guildoo), a former singer, and Dick Marx, a jazz musician and founder of a jingle company in the early 1960s. His father was of German-Jewish descent. Marx attended North Shore Country Day School. He has three half-siblings from his father's previous marriage.

Music career
Marx began his career in music at age five, singing commercial jingles written by his father's company; his list of advertising hits includes Arm & Hammer, Ken-L Ration and Nestlé Crunch. Marx was 17 and living in Highland Park, Illinois when a tape of his songs ended up in the hands of Lionel Richie. Richie thought Marx had talent and told the teen, "I can't promise you anything, but you should come to L.A."

Marx said one of the first musicians he met in Los Angeles was Fee Waybill of The Tubes with whom he has collaborated at least 30 times. They met in a recording studio. In that same 2014 video segment for Ameoba Records. Marx called Waybill "my life-long best friend" and said Waybill is also godfather to his children. Waybill went into great detail about their working relationship in a 2020 interview with American Songwriter.

Debut album and stardom
Marx's self-titled debut album, released in June 1987, yielded four hit singles and went triple platinum. The debut single, "Don't Mean Nothing", is a song about the potential pitfalls of the music business. "Don't Mean Nothing" reached No. 3 on the U.S. Billboard Hot 100 and No. 1 on Billboards Album Rock chart. Marx became the first new artist played on 117 radio stations nationwide during his initial week on the charts. The next two singles, "Should've Known Better" and "Endless Summer Nights", reached No. 3 and No. 2, respectively. The fourth single released from the album, "Hold On to the Nights", earned Marx his first No. 1 hit. The latter three of the album's singles were also hits on Billboards Adult Contemporary chart, beginning a long string of hits on that chart.

With the success of his self-titled album, Marx embarked on his first world tour, initially opening for REO Speedwagon, but quickly began headlining his own shows. His first tour kept him on the road for 14 months.

In 1988, Marx was nominated for a Grammy Award for Best Rock Vocal Performance – Solo for "Don't Mean Nothing". The same year, the song "Surrender to Me", which he co-wrote with Ross Vanelli, appeared in the film Tequila Sunrise.

Repeat Offender, Marx's second album, was released in May 1989. It rose to No. 1 on Billboards album chart. It went triple platinum within a few months and eventually sold over 5 million copies in the United States alone. The first two singles, "Satisfied" and the platinum-selling "Right Here Waiting", both reached No. 1.

"Right Here Waiting" was Marx's first No. 1 hit on the U.S. Adult Contemporary chart as well as his first big hit outside of North America, reaching No. 1 in several European countries and giving Marx his first top ten hit in the UK. It has been covered numerous times, most notably by Monica and 112 in a 1998 duet. Another single from the album, "Children of the Night", was written and composed in support of a Van Nuys-based organization for runaways. It became the sixth single from Repeat Offender.

Marx performed the Beatles' "Help" at the Berlin Wall in late 1989. Marx also received his second Grammy nomination in 1990 for Best Pop Vocal Performance – Male for "Right Here Waiting".

1990s
In 1991, Marx released his third consecutive platinum album Rush Street. The album saw artists such as Luther Vandross and Billy Joel appear as backing vocalists and guest pianists. The disc's first single, "Keep Coming Back", went to No. 12 on the Hot 100 and its second single, "Hazard", made it to No. 9. Both songs hit No. 1 on Billboards Adult Contemporary chart for four weeks and one week respectively. "Hazard" became Marx's second UK top ten, reaching No. 3.

In early 1994, as he and his family permanently left Los Angeles behind and returned to Chicago, Marx released Paid Vacation, and scored his fourth consecutive platinum album. The acoustic ballad "Now and Forever" peaked at No. 7 on the Hot 100, his  top ten hit on that chart.

The year 1997 saw the release of Flesh and Bone, Marx's final studio album on the Capitol imprint. The disc's first single, "Until I Find You Again", hit No. 3 on the U.S. Adult Contemporary chart and No. 42 on the Billboard Hot 100.

Marx's Greatest Hits compilation was released in November 1997. The 16-track album includes a variety of hit singles from his first five albums plus "Angel's Lullaby", a song written about his children originally appearing on For Our Children, Too, a compilation CD released in 1996 to benefit the Pediatric AIDS Foundation. Greatest Hits was released in Asia in November 1998 and included two new songs, "Slipping Away" and "Thanks to You", a tribute to his mother. The album was certified Gold in the U.S.

2000s
In 2000, Marx debuted his sixth studio album, titled Days in Avalon. This disc was released on the Signal 21 Records label founded by Marx and former Blood, Sweat & Tears drummer and record producer Bobby Colomby. 

After signing a new deal with his former label, Manhattan Records, Marx released the 2004 album My Own Best Enemy.

In 2008, Marx released Duo, on which he collaborated with Vertical Horizon's lead singer Matt Scannell.

On June 12, 2008, Marx was part of a PBS television series called Songwriters in the Round Presents: Legends & Lyrics. In Episode 102 of the first season, Marx appeared along with Kenny Loggins, Nathan Lee, and rock band Three Doors Down. This episode also featured an interview with singer-songwriter Diane Warren.

On October 31, 2008, "Emotional Remains" and "Sundown" were released, as digital downloads, on Marx's official site.

On December 6, 2008, Marx headlined a fundraiser for cystic fibrosis research, "Newsapalooza", sponsored by WLS-AM's Roe Conn program, in which Marx both performed several of his hits with his band and accompanied Chicago broadcast news reporters and anchors covering rock hits.

In an interview published in Rolling Stone on June 26, 2009, Marx said he was "ashamed" of having been linked to a $1.92 million fine against single mother Jammie Thomas-Rasset by the Recording Industry Association of America (RIAA). Rasset had shared 24 songs on the file-sharing website Kazaa in 2005, and Marx's "Now and Forever" was one of them.

Marx played piano on the song "Here" and produced Matt Scannell's vocals on two tracks for Vertical Horizon's 2009 album, entitled Burning the Days.

2010s
In March 2010, Marx released Stories To Tell, his first fully acoustic album.

On May 3, 2011, Marx was invited onto the stage at the Curran Theater in San Francisco by Hugh Jackman. It was opening night of Hugh Jackman in Performance. Jackman and Marx sang "Right Here Waiting" together, with Marx changing the lyrics of the last chorus to "right here waiting for Hugh".

Also on May 3, 2011, the reissue of Stories to Tell was released in the United States as a three-disc set exclusively through Walmart. The set included a "best of" disc, an acoustic disc of tracks, and a DVD of a live concert performance at the Shepherd's Bush venue in England. The album was also made available for purchase on iTunes and Amazon, but without the bonus DVD and album booklet. "Everybody" was released as a single in Europe and "When You Loved Me" was released in the U.S., peaking in the Top 20 on the Adult Contemporary chart.

In the summer of 2011, Marx collaborated with the internet comedy duo Rhett and Link, producing a celebrity endorsement for a colon-cleansing spa in Sacramento, California. The ad spot and its "making of" was featured on an episode of Rhett and Link's Commercial Kings television series on IFC.

On November 1, 2011, Marx released The Christmas EP, a five-song collection of Christmas songs. In October 2012, Marx followed up The Christmas EP with a full album of holiday tracks that he called Christmas Spirit.

On July 8, 2014, Marx released his eleventh studio album, Beautiful Goodbye.

2020s
Marx's next album, Limitless, was released on February 7, 2020. Its lead-off single, "Another One Down", hit No. 14 on Billboards Adult Contemporary chart, giving Marx a span of 32 years at the format.

In 2021, he appeared in the Family Guy episode "Young Parent Trap".

His autobiography Stories to Tell, was released in July 2021.

He appears as himself in the 200th episode of The Goldbergs, "The Wedding" which aired in March 2022.

His his new album Songwriter was released on September 30, 2022 and released the first single Same Heartbreak, Different Day on July 15, 2022. A previous non-album single Just Go that was subsequently  released as a bonus track to the Beautiful Goodbye is also on this album, along with the studio version of Moscow Calling that had also been a bonus track to Beautiful Goodbye as a remix.

Collaborations

1986 – Marx contributed backing vocals on Madonna's True Blue album and can particularly be heard on the track "White Heat".
1988 – Marx co-wrote (with Fee Waybill) and played keyboards on Edge Of A Broken Heart, Vixen's first single from their debut album.
1991 – Marx contributed backing vocals on Cher's Love Hurts album and can particularly be heard on the track "A World Without Heroes".
1993 – Marx played piano on John Farnham's 1993 song "The Reason Why".
1997 – Marx recorded "At the Beginning" with Donna Lewis for the 1997 film Anastasia.
1997 – Marx recorded "Surrender to Me" with Lara Fabian for the 1997 album Flesh and Bones International Ed.
1999 – Marx built "Renegade Studios", a state of the art recording facility located in his hometown of Chicago, Illinois. Artists such as Philip Sayce, Keith Urban, and Emerson Drive have recorded material at this location.
2000 – Marx wrote and produced "This I Promise You", a single by NSYNC.
2002 – Marx collaborated with Mexican singer Paulina Rubio on her sixth studio album and first English debut album, writing the song titled 'Border Girl' which led to the album's name titled Border Girl. 
2004 – At the 46th Grammy Awards on February 8, 2004, Marx won a Grammy for Song of the Year for "Dance with My Father", which he wrote and composed in collaboration with Luther Vandross. On that same night, he played the piano accompanying Celine Dion in performing "Dance with My Father", since Vandross was not present at the ceremony for health reasons. (Vandross died the following year.)
2006 – During summer 2006, Marx toured with Ringo Starr & His All Starr Band. Other members of that year's All Starr Band included Edgar Winter, Sheila E, and Billy Squier.
 2006 – Marx appeared on the Fox network's TV show Celebrity Duets in September 2006. Other singers to take part in the series included Smokey Robinson, Dionne Warwick, Cyndi Lauper, Kenny Loggins, Patti LaBelle, Randy Travis, Jesse McCartney, and Gladys Knight.
2007 – In 2007 Marx released a new ballad titled "Your Goodbye" and a new version of his classic love song "Hold On to the Nights" on a Phil Ramone compilation production called New Music from an Old Friend. This compilation was released on the Target label Spotlight.

Personal life
On January 8, 1989, Marx married singer, dancer, and actress Cynthia Rhodes, who appeared in Staying Alive, Flashdance, and Dirty Dancing. Rhodes appeared as the female lead in Marx's first video, "Don't Mean Nothing". The couple have three sons – Brandon (born 1990), Lucas (born 1992), and Jesse (born 1994) — and previously resided in Lake Bluff, Illinois. He currently resides in Malibu, California. In April 2014, the couple announced they were divorcing after 25 years of marriage.

On December 23, 2015, Marx married entrepreneur and former MTV VJ Daisy Fuentes in Aspen, Colorado, as confirmed on his official Facebook page.

On December 21, 2016, it was reported that Marx helped Korean Air flight attendants pacify an unruly, possibly intoxicated passenger while he and his wife were aboard a flight bound from Hanoi to Seoul, even providing photographic evidence of the incident. He also criticized the airline's handling of the situation. In response, Korean Air stated that they would respond more assertively to similar situations in the future.

Discography

Studio albums
 Richard Marx (1987)
 Repeat Offender (1989)
 Rush Street (1991)
 Paid Vacation (1994)
 Flesh and Bone (1997)
 Days in Avalon (2000)
 My Own Best Enemy (2004)
 Emotional Remains (2008)
 Sundown (2008)
 Christmas Spirit (2012)
 Seven & Seven (2012)
 Beautiful Goodbye (2014)
 Limitless (2020)
 Songwriter (2022)

Filmography

Awards and nominationsASCAP Pop Music Awards!Ref.
|-
| rowspan=2|1986
| "What About Me?"
| rowspan=14|Most Performed Songs
| 
| rowspan=2|
|-
| "Crazy"
| 
|-
| rowspan=3|1989
| "Endless Summer Nights"
| 
| rowspan=3|
|-
| "Hold On to the Nights"
| 
|-
| "Should've Known Better"
| 
|-
| rowspan=2|1990
| "Satisfied"
| 
| rowspan=2|
|-
| rowspan=2|"Right Here Waiting"
| 
|-
| rowspan=2|1991
| 
| rowspan=2|
|-
| "Angelia"
| 
|-
| rowspan=2|1994
| "Take This Heart"
| 
| rowspan=2|
|-
| "Now and Forever"
| 
|-
| 1996
| "The Way She Loves Me"
| 
| 
|-
| 2002
| "This I Promise You"
| 
| rowspan=2|
|-
| 2005
| "Dance with My Father"
| Grammy Awards|-
| 1986
| St. Elmo's Fire
| Best Score Soundtrack for Visual Media
| 
|-
| 1988
| "Don't Mean Nothing"
| Best Rock Vocal Performance, Male
| 
|-
| 1990
| "Right Here Waiting"
| Best Pop Vocal Performance, Male
| 
|-
| rowspan=2|2004
| rowspan=2|"Dance with My Father"
| Song of the Year
| 
|-
| Best R&B Song
| Billboard Music Awards|-
| rowspan=6|1987
| rowspan=4|Himself
| Top New Artist
| 
|-
| Top Billboard 200 Artist
| 
|-
| Top Hot 100 Artist
| 
|-
| Top Hot 100 Artist – Male
| 
|-
| Richard Marx
| Top Billboard 200 Album
| 
|-
| "Don't Mean Nothing"
| Top Hot 100 Song
| 
|-
| rowspan=9|1988
| rowspan=8|Himself
| Top Artist
| 
|-
| Top Male Artist
| 
|-
| Top Billboard 200 Artist
| 
|-
| Top Billboard 200 Artist – Male
| 
|-
| Top Hot 100 Artist
| 
|-
| Top Hot 100 Artist – Male
| 
|-
| Top Adult Contemporary Artist
| 
|-
| Top Adult Contemporary Artist – Male
| 
|-
| Richard Marx
| Top Billboard 200 Album
| 
|-
| rowspan=2|1994
| Himself
| Top Adult Contemporary Artist
| 
|-
| "Now and Forever"
| Top Adult Contemporary Track
| Other awards'
{| class=wikitable
|-
! Year !! Awards !! Work !! Category !! Result
|-
| 1988
| Pollstar Concert Industry Awards
| Tour 
| Club Tour of the Year 
| 
|-
| rowspan=3|1990
| Kids Choice Awards
| rowspan=2|Himself
| Favorite Male Musician 
| 
|-
| American Music Awards
| Favorite Pop/Rock Male Artist 
| 
|-
| ASCAP Film & TV Awards
| "Surrender to Me"
| Most Performed Song from Motion Picture
| 
|-
| 2013
| O Music Awards
| Himself
| Must Follow Artist on Twitter
|

References

External links
 
 
 
 

 
1963 births
Living people
20th-century American keyboardists
20th-century American guitarists
20th-century American male musicians
20th-century American singers
21st-century American keyboardists
21st-century American male musicians
21st-century American memoirists
21st-century American singers
American autobiographers
American contemporary R&B singers
American male guitarists
American male pianists
American male pop singers
American male singers
American male songwriters
American people of German-Jewish descent
American pop guitarists
American pop pianists
American pop rock singers
American rock guitarists
American rock keyboardists
American rock pianists
American rock singers
American rock songwriters
American soft rock musicians
American tenors
Ballad musicians
Capitol Records artists
EMI Records artists
Frontiers Records artists
Grammy Award winners
Guitarists from California
Guitarists from Chicago
Manhattan Records artists
North Shore Country Day School alumni
People from Highland Park, Illinois
People from Lake Bluff, Illinois
People from Malibu, California
Record producers from California
Record producers from Illinois
Ringo Starr & His All-Starr Band members
Singers from California
Singers from Chicago
Songwriters from California
Songwriters from Illinois